"La De La Mala Suerte" (English: "The Unlucky One") is a pop song written by Mexican pop duo Jesse & Joy. The song is included on their third studio album, ¿Con Quién Se Queda El Perro? (2011), and was released as the third single from the album on 13 March 2012.

Trackslisting

Charts (Original version)

Pablo Alborán version

The song was re-released featuring Spanish singer-song writer Pablo Alborán. It was first played on 14 May 2013 and released digitally on 21 June 2013. The song peaked at number 17 on the Spanish singles chart in December 2013.

Charts (Duet version)

Release history

See also
List of number-one songs of 2012 (Mexico)

References 

2012 singles
2013 singles
Jesse & Joy songs
Pablo Alborán songs
Songs written by Joy Huerta
Songs written by Jesse Huerta
Monitor Latino Top General number-one singles
Pop ballads
Warner Music Group singles
2011 songs